Acacia roycei is a shrub or tree of the genus Acacia and the subgenus Plurinerves that is endemic to an area of western Australia.

Description
Like most species of Acacia it has phyllodes rather than true leaves. It blooms from August to October and produces yellow flowers.

Taxonomy
The species was first formally described by the botanist Bruce Maslin in 1977 as a part of the work Studies in the genus Acacia (Mimosaceae) Miscellany as published in the journal Nuytsia. It was reclassified in 2003 by Leslie Pedley as Racosperma roycei then transferred back to genus Acacia in 2006.

Distribution
It is native to an area in the Mid West, Gascoyne and Wheatbelt regions of Western Australia where it is commonly situated on sandplains growing in sandy or sandy-loam soils. The range of the plant extends from Ajana in the south to around Towrana Station in the north to the south of Gascoyne Junction where it is commonly a part of closed Acacia scrubland communities.

See also
List of Acacia species

References

roycei
Acacias of Western Australia
Taxa named by Bruce Maslin
Plants described in 1977